Ponte do Bico is a bridge in Portugal. It is located in Braga District, crossing the Cávado River.

It is a work from the time of minister Fontes Pereira de Melo who is mostly remembered for conducting dynamic industrial and public infrastructure policy which become known as Fontismo (after his name).

See also
List of bridges in Portugal

Bico
Bridges over the Cávado River
Buildings and structures in Braga